Aspidacantha is a genus of flies in the family Stratiomyidae.

Species
Aspidacantha aethiops Lindner, 1939
Aspidacantha atra Kertész, 1916
Aspidacantha minuta (Lindner, 1966)

References

Stratiomyidae
Brachycera genera
Taxa named by Kálmán Kertész
Diptera of Africa